Kaurenoic acid (ent-kaur-16-en-19-oic acid or Kauren-19-oic acid) is a diterpene with antibacterial activity against Gram-positive bacteria. However its low solubility and blood lytic activity on erythrocytes might make it a poor pharmaceutical candidate. Kaurenoic acid also has uterine relaxant activity via calcium blockade and opening ATP-sensitive potassium channels.

Kaurenoic acid is found in several plants such as Copaifera.  It is a potential biomarker for the presence of sunflower in foods.

Medical use

Kaurenoic acid has been studied for its medicinal properties and seems to have anti-inflammatory, antiulcerogenic, antitumor, antinociceptive, antimelanoma, antitilipoperoxidation, antioxidant and antimicrobial
properties.

Kaurenoic acid decreases leukocyte migration. It seems to inhibit histamine and serotonin pathways, in addition to antiprotozoal activities against Trypanosoma cruzi and Leishmania amazonensis.

References 

Diterpenes
Tetracyclic compounds
Carboxylic acids